The Grammar School and Sixth Form Centre is a co-educational state-funded grammar school located in St. Andrew's, Guernsey.

See also
List of schools in Guernsey

References

External links 
Guernsey Grammar School website

Grammar School Guernsey
Secondary schools in the Channel Islands
Sixth form colleges in British Overseas Territories and Crown Dependencies